The 2009 CONCACAF Champions League Final was a two-legged football match-up to determine the 2008–09 CONCACAF Champions League champions. It was contested by two Mexican clubs, Atlante and Cruz Azul, being the third all-Mexican CONCACAF club championship final in the last four years.

The first leg was held in Estadio Azul of Mexico City, and won by Atlante 2–0. The second leg was held in Estadio Andrés Quintana Roo in Cancún, where both teams tied 0–0. Atlante F.C. won the competition 3–1 on points (2–0 on aggregate), achieving their second CONCACAF Cup trophy.

Venues

Rules 
Like other match-ups in the knockout round, the teams played two games, one at each team's home stadium. If the teams remained tied after 90 minutes of play during the 2nd leg, the away goals rule would be used, but not after a tie enters extra time, and so a tie would be decided by penalty shootout if the aggregate score is level after extra time.

Final summary 
Fernando Navarro opened the scoring for Atlante in the 17th minute at Estadio Azul in Mexico City, and Christian Bermúdez added the second in the 24th. Rafael Márquez Lugo set up both goals, which came from close-in shots from six meters.

First leg

Second leg

References

2008–09 CONCACAF Champions League
2008–09 in Mexican football
Cruz Azul matches
Atlante F.C. matches
International club association football competitions hosted by Mexico
CONCACAF Champions League finals